Pustovsky is a rural locality (a khutor) in Slashchyovskoye Rural Settlement, Kumylzhensky District, Volgograd Oblast, Russia. The population was 5 as of 2010. There are 2 streets.

Geography 
Pustovsky is located in forest steppe, on Khopyorsko-Buzulukskaya Plain, on the bank of the Khopyor River, 36 km southwest of Kumylzhenskaya (the district's administrative centre) by road. Ostroukhov is the nearest rural locality.

References 

Rural localities in Kumylzhensky District